Jarl Henning Ulrichsen (born 15 July 1947) is a professor of the New Testament and its context at Norwegian University of Science and Technology in Trondheim and a chess FIDE Master (FM).

Biography
Jarl Henning Ulrichsen received his doctorate from the University of Oslo in 1982 with a dissertation on the Basic Scriptures of the Wills of the Twelve Patriarchs. He has published Textbook in Biblical Hebrew (2006) and Greek-Norwegian dictionary for the New Testament (2009).

Jarl Henning Ulrichsen is also a chess player with the title of FIDE Master from the FIDE. He was a Norwegian senior chess champion on several occasions, most recently at the National Championships in Trondheim in 2014.

Jarl Henning Ulrichsen played for Norway in the Chess Olympiad:
 In 1974, at the first reserve board in the 21st Chess Olympiad in Nice (+6, =5, -1).

Jarl Henning Ulrichsen played for Norway in the Nordic Chess Cup:
 In 1973, at the sixth board in the 4th Nordic Chess Cup in Ribe (+1, =3, -1), winning a team bronze medal.

Jarl Henning Ulrichsen is also known as a chess endgame problemist.

References

External links

Jarl Henning Ulrichsen chess games at 365chess.com

1947 births
Living people
Chess FIDE Masters
Norwegian chess players
Chess Olympiad competitors
Chess composers
Academic staff of the Norwegian University of Science and Technology